Paul Harrison Tibbitt IV (born May 13, 1968) is an American animator, television producer, writer, storyboard artist, songwriter, voice actor, and director, best known for working on the animated series SpongeBob SquarePants. After SpongeBob creator Stephen Hillenburg resigned in 2004, Tibbitt took the position of showrunner for the show. He also took over as the voice of Potty the Parrot, whom Hillenburg had voiced until his resignation. Tibbitt made his feature film directorial debut directing The SpongeBob Movie: Sponge Out of Water. He studied in the Character Animation program at the California Institute of the Arts.

In 2015, Vincent Waller (a creative director) and Marc Ceccarelli (a writer and storyboard director) took Tibbitt's place as supervising producer and showrunner. It was also announced that Tibbitt would leave the series after season 9 to work on The SpongeBob Movie: Sponge on the Run (which was produced and released without the involvement of the show's crew by a separate crew), but he lent his directing and writing position to Tim Hill. He now works at DreamWorks Animation.

Filmography

Television

Film

References

External links
 

1968 births
American animators
American cartoonists
American television producers
American television writers
American male television writers
Nickelodeon Animation Studio people
California Institute of the Arts alumni
Living people
American male songwriters
American male comedians
21st-century American comedians
Showrunners
American storyboard artists
Place of birth missing (living people)
American male screenwriters
American television directors
American film directors
American animated film directors
American animated film producers
21st-century American screenwriters
21st-century American male writers